"Get Up" is a song by Dutch DJ R3hab and  American R&B singer Ciara. It was written by R3hab and Ciara and produced by R3hab. It was released on 29 January 2016. It has been streamed over 1.11 million times on SoundCloud.

Background
In April 2015, Ciara surprised fans during a performance with DJ R3hab's setlist at the Coachella Valley Music and Arts Festival. The Grammy Award-winning artist joined the DJ for two songs in the Sahara Tent Friday night which included "Get Up" and the R3hab remix of her then latest single "I Bet". The latter is included as bonus track on the deluxe edition of Ciara's sixth studio album Jackie (2016).

Composition
An electro house song with a dance-pop melody. It lasts for three minutes and 14  seconds and has a tempo of 122 BPM.

"Get Up" features old school vibes in the form of vintage house chords while the cheerful chorus will light up any dance floor.

Track listing
Digital download
"Get Up" — 3:14

Digital download - Extended Mix
"Get Up" (Extended Mix) — 4:19

Digital download - Remix
"Get Up" (KSHMR Remix) — 3:23

Charts

References

 

2016 songs
Ciara songs
R3hab songs
Songs written by Ciara